Motor vehicle theft is an act that, if successful, results in a stolen car.

Stolen Car may refer to the title of one of several works of art:

Film and TV
 "Stolen Car" (That '70s Show episode), 1999

Music
 Stolen Car, a 2010 album by Certain General

Songs
 "Stolen Car" (Bruce Springsteen song), from the 1980 album The River
 "Stolen Car" (Beth Orton song), from the 1999 album Central Reservation
 "Stolen Car (Take Me Dancing)", a song by Sting from Sacred Love
 "Stolen Car" (Mylène Farmer song), a 2015 cover of the Sting song by French singer Mylène Farmer featuring the original recording artist

See also
 "Stolen Cars", a 2021 song by Allday